Chimwemwe Idana (born 7 September 1998) is a Malawian footballer who plays as a midfielder for Nyasa Big Bullets and the Malawi national team. He was included in Malawi's squad for the 2021 Africa Cup of Nations.

References

External links

1998 births
Living people
Malawian footballers
People from Blantyre
Association football midfielders
Nyasa Big Bullets FC players
Malawi international footballers
2021 Africa Cup of Nations players